Bagherwal is a Jain community originated from Baghera, a princely state in Rajasthan (in India). Presently this town is situated in Ajmer district of Rajasthan near Kekri.

History
Stone inscriptions from the eleventh century A.D. refer to this community as located in Chittorgarh, Ranthambore and Mandalgarh at various times. During the foreign aggression of North India in the twelfth century, the community left these forts and spread to villages and towns of Rajputana and Madhya Pradesh. About six hundred years ago, three hundred families migrated to Maharashtra from Chittor under the leadership of Jijaji and Punaji Khatod. This group settled in Maharashtra.

All community members are followers of the Jain religion (Digambar). The community has built Jain temples in Rajasthan, Madhya Pradesh, Maharashtra. Kirti Stambh, built by one of the community members, Jijaji Kathod, at Chittor fort is a historical monument. It is a seven-story structure built in the twelfth century AD. 

Different clans have followed different monastic lineages, Mula Sangh Balatkara Gana, Mula Sangh Sena Gana and Kashtha Sangha. Their center in Karanja Lad had thus seats of three bhattarakas of each of the three traditions.

Pandit Ashadhar, a scholar of Jain philosophy in the 13th century, writer of about 100 manuscripts in Sanskrit, was born in this community.

Bagherwal today
Currently Bagherwal FERGS
idarbha, their main centers are Karanja Lad and Nagpur. Bagherwal population is about thirty thousands. Main occupation of the community is Trade and business.
Now this community has spread to Delhi, Mumbai, Nagpur, Karnataka, and Uttar Pradesh. Few families have settled outside India in Australia, England, Germany, Thailand and United States.

There are 55 Gotras: Thai, Harsora, Khatod, Todh, Thag, Kuchila, Lambabans, Sethiya, Babriya, Dungerwal, Dhanopiya, Kotia, Katariya, Madiya, Bagda, Thathediya, Kherkhadiya, Bagdiya, Golwal, Jogiya, Pitaliya, Borkhandiya, Karda, Ketagi Bhanwar, Bhandari, Sabdra, Chamariya, Chanwariya, Ugatiya, Sanwala, Sarwadiya, tajlanda, Nabhaipura, Barmunda, Bhandsali, Sakuniya, Panwariya, Aadujiya, Mohiwal, Thola, Thora, Satoriya, Mandliya, Badalchat, Charhadiya, Pipaliya, Doraya, Narpatiya, Nigotia, Jathaniwal, Surlaya, Sarpatiya, Dhanotia, Dugeriya, Harsola, Samriya

Organization
A national level organization of the community Akhil Bharatvarshiya Digambar Jain Bagherwal Sangh was established in 1956 at Bijoliya. There are five regional organizations covering Kota, Bundi, Malwa, Mewar and Dakshin regions. The community has established a charitable trust ‘Bagherwal Parmarthik Trust’ for welfares of its community members. it was established in 1983. It provides scholarships to students, assistance to widows and medical help.

Publications

Community publications
Bagherwal Web Site
Bagherwal Sandesh (Monthly news magazine)
Bagherwal Samaj Sandesh (Monthly news magazine)
Pratibimb ( quarterly magazine )

Books published about community
 Bagherwal Jati Ithias by Vidyadhar Johrapurkar
 Pandit Ashadhar. Vyaktitva and Kratitava by Nemi Chand Dongaonkar

References

Jain communities
Social groups of India